Claudio Paul Spinelli (born 21 June 1997) is an Argentine footballer who plays for Deportivo Maldonado as a forward.

Club career
In July 2018, he signed with Serie A Italian club Genoa, and on 14 August 2018, he was sent on a season-long loan to Serie B club Crotone.

He made his Serie B debut for Crotone on 26 August 2018 in a game against Cittadella as an 82nd-minute substitute for Davide Faraoni. He made his first start for Crotone on 20 October 2018 against Padova and scored his first goal in Italy in the 12th minute as Crotone won 2–1.

On 30 January 2019, Spinelli joined Argentine club Argentinos Juniors on loan until 30 June 2019. Spinelli scored his first goal for Argentinos Juniors on 5 March 2019 in a 4–1 victory over Douglas Haig in the Copa Argentina. Spinelli scored his second goal for Argentinos Juniors on 14 April 2019 in a 3–2 victory over Independiente in the Copa de la Superliga.

On 1 October 2020, Spinelli joined Slovenian side Koper on a season-long loan.

On 19 July 2021, he joined Oleksandriya in Ukraine.

On 17 March 2022, Spinelli signed with Lanús.

References

1997 births
Living people
Footballers from Buenos Aires
Argentine footballers
Association football forwards
Club Atlético Tigre footballers
San Martín de San Juan footballers
Genoa C.F.C. players
F.C. Crotone players
Argentinos Juniors footballers
Club de Gimnasia y Esgrima La Plata footballers
FC Koper players
FC Oleksandriya players
Club Atlético Lanús footballers
Argentine Primera División players
Serie B players
Slovenian PrvaLiga players
Ukrainian Premier League players
Argentine expatriate footballers
Argentine expatriate sportspeople in Italy
Expatriate footballers in Italy
Argentine expatriate sportspeople in Slovenia
Expatriate footballers in Slovenia
Argentine expatriate sportspeople in Ukraine
Expatriate footballers in Ukraine